Steve Hall (born  in St Helens, Merseyside) is an English former professional rugby league footballer.

He played for the London Broncos, St. Helens in the Super League and also French club the Saint-Gaudens Bears.

Hall played for St. Helens on the wing in their 2000 Super League Grand Final victory over Wigan Warriors

As of 2012, Hall is a keen cyclist and runs his family-owed second-hand car dealership with his parents and brother in his hometown of St. Helens.

References

External links
 (archived by web.archive.org) Statistics at slstats.org
Statistics at rugbyleagueproject.org
Saints Heritage Society profile

1979 births
Living people
English expatriate rugby league players
English expatriate sportspeople in France
English rugby league players
Expatriate rugby league players in France
London Broncos players
Rugby league players from St Helens, Merseyside
Rugby league wingers
Saint-Gaudens Bears players
St Helens R.F.C. players
Widnes Vikings players